U3 small nucleolar ribonucleoprotein protein MPP10 is a protein that in humans is encoded by the MPHOSPH10 gene.

This gene encodes a protein that is phosphorylated during mitosis. The protein localizes to the nucleolus during interphase and to the chromosomes during M phase. The protein is thought to be part of the U3 small nucleolar ribonucleoprotein complex, which is involved in rRNA processing.

References

Further reading

External links